Brian Hope-Taylor (b. Surrey, 21 October 1923 – Cambridge, 12 January 2001) was an artist, archaeologist, broadcaster and university lecturer, who made a significant contribution to the understanding of early British history.

Biography
In order to advance himself professionally, Hope-Taylor was permitted in 1958 to register at St John's College, Cambridge, to undertake a PhD thesis concerning the archeology of Yeavering, Northumberland, a seat of governance in Anglo-Saxon Britain, despite not having a first degree, never having been to university. He was awarded his doctorate in 1961, when, encouraged by Glyn Daniel, he was appointed as a University Assistant Lecturer in Archaeology at Cambridge. His promotion to a full lectureship was followed, in 1967, by election to a fellowship at University College (now Wolfson College). He became an expert on Yeavering over his years of work there, publishing the excavation report in 1977.

During his time at Cambridge, he continued excavating early Anglo-Saxon sites in the North: on Lindisfarne, at Doon Hill (Dunbar), and at Bamburgh Castle, where he discovered the Bamburgh Sword in 1960. Between the work at Doon Hill and Bamburgh, there came the call (in 1966) to undertake engineering excavations within York Minster, when it was realised that the great building was threatened by collapse. During the repairs which followed, much of his time was spent on ensuring the completion of the essential archaeological investigations, in his capacity as Director of Research, with a committee chaired by his friend, Sir Mortimer Wheeler.  Finally, in 1973, he directed a rescue excavation when construction of the A11 required a cutting to be made through the Devil's Dyke in Cambridgeshire.

During the 1960s, Hope-Taylor was recruited by Anglia Television to write and present two successful archaeological series, Who were the British? (1966) and The Lost Centuries (1968), the former of which was nominated for a BAFTA award. He also made a one-off special, The Fight for York Minster (1967), an excursion into the domain of campaigning journalism – in which he emphasised to the British public the historical and cultural value of restoring the Minster. The new medium of television was one which, in the words of his director and producer, Hope-Taylor 'embraced with consummate ease'.

Hope-Taylor resigned his position in Cambridge in 1976 and moved up north, to live in Wooler, Northumberland – close to the Yeavering site that had been the subject of his thesis – where he was cared for in ill health by old friends Vera and Lionel Rutherford. Back to health, he returned to Cambridge in 1981, planning to renew old acquaintances and pursue further archeological discoveries.

Publications

References

External links
 Hope-Taylor's publications on the Archaeology Data Service

1923 births
2001 deaths
Alumni of St John's College, Cambridge
Fellows of University College, Cambridge
Fellows of Wolfson College, Cambridge
People from Surrey (before 1965)
British television presenters
Anglo-Saxon studies scholars
20th-century British historians
People from Wooler